An inboard motor is a marine propulsion system for boats. As opposed to an outboard motor where an engine is mounted outside the hull of the craft, an inboard motor is an engine enclosed within the hull of the boat, usually connected to a propulsion screw by a 
driveshaft.

In international shipping the marine diesel engines are the largest most powerful engines ever produced.

History

The first marine craft to utilize inboard motors were steam engines going back to 1805 and the Clermont and the Charlotte Dundas.  Harbour tugs, and small steam launches had
inboard steam engines.  In the 1880s the naphtha engine made its appearance and a few boat engines appeared. Such engines had low power and high fuel consumption. The gasoline (petrol) engine pioneer Gottlieb Daimler and Maybach built a four-cycle boat engine and tested it in 1887 on the Neckar River.  Sintz in America built several commercially available engines from 1893.

Sizes

Inboard motors may be of several types, suitable for the size of craft they are fitted to. Boats can use one cylinder to v12 engines, depending if they are used for racing or trolling.

Small craft
For pleasure craft, such as sailboats and speedboats, diesel, gasoline and electric engines are used.  Many inboard motors are derivatives of automobile engines, known as marine automobile engines.  The advent of the stern drive propulsion leg improved design so that auto engines could easily power boats.

Large craft
For larger craft, including ships, where outboard propulsion would in any case not be suitable, the propulsion system may include many types, such as diesel, gas turbine, or even fossil-fuel or nuclear-generated steam. Some early models used coal for steam-driven ships.

The largest engines in the world are marine diesel engines used to power supertankers and container ships. E.g. the Wärtsilä RT-flex96C produces 109,000 horsepower, weighs 2,300 tons, stands 44-feet tall, is 90-feet long, and has a maximum of 109 rpm.

Cooling
Some inboard motors are freshwater cooled, while others have a raw water cooling system where water from the lake, river or sea is pumped by the engine to cool it.

However, as seawater is corrosive, and can damage engine blocks and cylinder heads, some seagoing craft have engines which are indirectly cooled via heat exchanger in a keel cooler. Other engines, notably small single and twin cylinder diesels specifically designed for marine use, use raw seawater for cooling and zinc sacrificial anodes are employed to protect the internal metal castings.

References

Marine engines